The Battle of Pierres Noires was a naval action that occurred during the Allied Operation Dredger, involving several Royal Canadian Navy (RCN) destroyers and a German Kriegsmarine U-boat with escorts near Brest, France.  The RCN force managed to sink or damage some of the escorts on the surface, but the U-boat was able to escape.

Background 
The port of Brest had been an important German U-boat base since the Fall of France, and its capture was one of the objectives of Operation Overlord. With the increasing effectiveness of the Allied anti-submarine campaign however it often became essential for any U-boat departing the port to have surface escorts. The German Kriegsmarine would often employ Vorpostenboot-class escort trawlers to accomplish that task, and over time these boats developed a reputation among the Allied navies.

Battle
 departed Brest on 5 July 1944 under the protection of 4 Vorpostenboot escort trawlers. Escort Group 12, with HMCS Qu'Appelle as the lead boat, detected the German force on radar and set off in pursuit at 30 knots. The two sides engaged in the vicinity of the Pierres Noires lighthouse in the late evening. The darkness, combined with uncertainty of the size of the German force and the close range at which the ships engaged each other nullified some of the advantage in speed and armour enjoyed by EG 12, and U-741 managed to escape. However, despite inflicting some damage to all of the Canadian vessels, the Vorpostenboot V-715 was sunk, another was heavily damaged, and the remainder withdrew to Brest. EG 12 withdrew to Portsmouth for repairs.

Aftermath 
Operation Dredger would continue with further Allied naval infiltration into the Bay of Biscay, engaging the U-boats and their escorts in their home waters. U-741 was sunk in the English Channel on 15 August, a few days after American forces began to lay siege to Brest. The last U-boat departed on 4 September, just before the Americans took control of the city on 19 September . HMCS Skeena would be lost in a storm off Iceland on 25 October, the only ship from EG 12 not to survive the war.

See also 
 Battle of Ushant (1944)

Notes

References

External links 
 Canada's Remembrances: The War at Sea
 HMCS Restigouche at Naval-History.net

Naval battles of World War II involving Canada
Naval battles of World War II involving Germany
July 1944 events
Canada–Germany relations